The Holy Cross Crusaders men's basketball team represents the College of the Holy Cross in Worcester, Massachusetts (about 40 miles (64 km) west of Boston) in NCAA Division I competition. The team competes in the Patriot League and plays their home games in the Hart Center. The program boasts such notable alumni as Boston Celtics legends Bob Cousy and Tom Heinsohn, and longtime Providence College basketball coach Joe Mullaney. Under coach Doggie Julian, the Crusaders won a national championship in 1947. It is the only school from Massachusetts to win an NCAA tournament.

History

Beginnings and national prominence
Basketball first appeared at Holy Cross in 1900 but was discontinued several times until its reinstatement in 1939. The Crusaders originally played their home games at the Boston Garden and the South High Community School. In 1947, the Crusaders, behind coach Doggie Julian, NCAA tournament MVP George Kaftan, star Joe Mullaney and freshman point guard Bob Cousy, beat Oklahoma at Madison Square Garden to win the NCAA championship.

The team entered the NCAA Division I men's basketball tournament as the last seed in the 8-team tournament. In the first game, Holy Cross defeated the Navy 55–47, in front of a sold-out crowd at Madison Square Garden. Mullaney led the team in scoring with 18 points, mostly in part to Navy coach Ben Carnevale's decision to have his players back off from Mullaney, who was reputed as being more of a playmaker than a shooter. In the semi-final match, Holy Cross faced the City College of New York, coached by Nat Holman. The Crusaders, led by Kaftan's 30-point game, defeated the Beavers 60–45. In the championship game, Holy Cross faced a Bruce Drake coached University of Oklahoma team in another sold-out game at Madison Square Garden. Kaftan followed up his semi-final game performance with 18 points in the title game, leading the Crusaders to a 58–47 victory against the Sooners. Along with UConn, Holy Cross is one of the two New England schools to ever win the NCAA tournament.

Holy Cross finished the 1947 championship season with 23 straight wins and became the first college from the New England area (as well as from the state of Massachusetts) to win a national college basketball title. 35,000 people watched a parade in the team's honor on Holy Cross Day in Worcester, Massachusetts. Future NBA legend Cousy was named AP and UP player of the year. In 1989, the NCAA voted teammate George Kaftan to the all-decade team of the 1940s.

The Crusaders followed up their championship by advancing to the 1948 NCAA Tournament's Final Four. After advancing to the Elite Eight in 1953, the Crusaders would wait 63 years before claiming another win in the NCAA Tournament.

In 1954, Holy Cross won the NIT Tournament behind another future NBA Hall-of-famer and Celtics legend Tom Heinsohn. This is widely recognized as the College's second national title in basketball due to the prestige of the NIT at the time.

In 1977, Holy Cross defeated a talented Providence team twice on last-second shots by forward Chris Potter and led top-ranked Michigan at the half in the first round of the NCAA tournament before being defeated. The following year, Sports Illustrated ranked Holy Cross and freshman of the year Ronnie Perry ninth in its pre-season poll.

Following the team's championship years of the 40s and 50s, the Crusaders have been ranked only occasionally by the Associated Press. After appearing in 65 of 116 total weekly polls (56%) in the 1950s, the Crusaders appeared in only 5 of 126 weekly polls (4%) in the 1960s and 9 of 148 (6%) in the 1970s. The Crusaders have not been nationally ranked since January 1978.

Patriot League 
Holy Cross could have joined the newly founded  Big East Conference in 1980, but college President Rev. John E. Brooks, S.J., vetoed the move for academic reasons. Holy Cross stayed independent until joining the Metro Atlantic Athletic Conference (MAAC) to start the 1983–84 season. It moved to the Patriot League in 1991.

In recent decades, the men's basketball team has been the leading varsity program of the Holy Cross' athletic department. The men's basketball team has won six Patriot League titles (1993, 2001, 2002, 2003, 2007, 2016) since the league's formation in 1991.

With Ralph Willard as head coach, the Holy Cross men's team nearly accomplished three major upsets in the NCAA tournament. In 2001 as a fifteen seed, the Crusaders lost 72–68 to a second-seeded Kentucky team who advanced to the Sweet Sixteen. In 2002, the sixteenth-seeded Crusaders nearly became the first #16 seed to defeat a #1 seed, losing 70–59 to a top-seeded Kansas squad who advanced to the Final Four. The Crusaders led 37–35 at halftime, 44–39 with 11 minutes remaining and trailed by three points with fewer than two minutes remaining. In 2003 as a fourteenth seed, the Crusaders lost 72–68 to third-seeded, Dwyane Wade-led Marquette that would advance to the Final Four.

In 2016, the Crusaders made a miraculous run in the postseason. The team entered the Patriot League Tournament as the ninth seed and ultimately defeated second-seeded Lehigh in the championship game to earn an automatic bid to the NCAA Tournament for the first time since 2007. The Crusaders then defeated Southern University marking the first NCAA win for the program since 1953.

Seasons

Postseason

NCAA tournament results
The Crusaders have appeared in the NCAA tournament 13 times. Their combined record is 8–13. They were national champions in 1947.

Men's NCAA Tournament Most Outstanding Player
1947 – George Kaftan

NIT results
The Crusaders have appeared in the National Invitation Tournament (NIT) 12 times. Their combined record is 11–11. They were NIT Champions in 1954.

Men's National Invitation Tournament Most Valuable Player
1954 – Togo Palazzi

CIT results
The Crusaders have appeared in the CollegeInsider.com Postseason Tournament (CIT) one time. Their record is 1–1.

Appearances in final national polls
Holy Cross has made 79 appearances in the AP Poll since it was introduced during the 1948-1949 season, peaking at No. 1 for five weeks in 1950. The College last appeared in the AP Poll during the 1977–1978 season. Holy Cross has finished the year ranked by the Helms Athletic Foundation in 1947 and in the final Associated Press poll of the season on six occasions:

Honored jerseys 
Note: As the College program stated, the jerseys were retired but not the "numbers" so other players can wear them:

NBA players

George Blaney (1961–1962)
Bob Cousy (1950–1963)
Jack Foley (1962–1963)
Tom Heinsohn (1956–1965)
George Kaftan (1948–1953)
Malcolm Miller (2011-2015)
Joe Mullaney (1949–1950) 
Dermie O'Connell (1948–1950)
Togo Palazzi (1954–1960)
Kevin Stacom (1974–1982)
Garry Witts (1981–1982)

International players

 Jehyve Floyd (born 1997), in the Israeli Basketball Premier League

Awards
All-America
1947 – George Kaftan (Second Team)
1948 – George Kaftan (Second Team), Bob Cousy (Third Team)
1949 – Bob Cousy (Second Team)
1950 – Bob Cousy (First Team)
1953 – Togo Palazzi (Third Team)
1954 – Togo Palazzi (Third Team)
1955 – Tom Heinsohn (Third Team)
1956 – Tom Heinsohn (First Team)
1962 – Jack Foley (Second Team)

References

External links
 

 
Basketball teams established in 1900